Motaalleq  , also Romanized as Mota‘alleq is a village in Abish Ahmad Rural District, Abish Ahmad District, Kaleybar County, East Azerbaijan Province, Iran. At the 2006 census, its population was 175, in 57 families.

Situation
The online edition of the Dehkhoda Dictionary, quoting Iranian Army files, reports a population of 143 people in late 1940s. At the 2006 census, its population was 175, in 57 families.  According to a more recent and, perhaps, reliable statistics the population is 115 people in 40 families.

Motaalleq Hot spring therapeutic facility
Yaqut al-Hamawi, writing in early thirteenth century, refers to a large river near Kaleybar, which has the property of curing the most inveterate fevers. One may infer that this statement is, indeed, a reference to multiple Hot springs in Motaalleq.

Motaalleq Hot spring therapeutic facility is the largest of its kind in Iran. The facility, with an area of 12870 m2 includes bathing areas, coffee-shop, restaurants, prayer room, and gymnasium.

Since its inception, the facility has been a bone of contention between authorities and villagers, who claim the ownership of the hot spring.

References 

Populated places in Kaleybar County